Octavian Ursu (born 27 October 1967) is a Romanian-born German politician for the Christian Democratic Union and mayor of Görlitz since June 2019.

Life

Ursu was born in Bucharest and graduated from the National University of Music Bucharest in 1986. He was the solo trumpeter of the Neuen Lausitzer Philharmonie. He is married, has two children and is an Orthodox Christian.

Running with the Christian Democratic Union, Ursu was elected as a representative of Görlitz in the 2014 Saxony state election and in June 2019, he was elected mayor of Görlitz. Although the far-right Alternative for Germany (AfD) party won the most votes and seats on the council, other parties united in a coalition behind Ursu. Ursu has opposed plans to end the Polish–German cooperation at a marketplace in Görlitz where traders of various nationalities, such as Poles, Czechs, Indians, Pakistanis and Vietnamese, sell goods. The AfD wants these traders to be evicted to make more space for German sellers.

References

External links
 Official website (in German)

1967 births
Living people
Christian Democratic Union of Germany politicians
Mayors of places in Germany
Members of the Romanian Orthodox Church
Musicians from Bucharest
National University of Music Bucharest alumni
Romanian emigrants to Germany